Frederic Meyers (May 6, 1932 - January 31, 2015) was a Canadian football player who played for the Edmonton Eskimos. He played college football at Oklahoma State University and Michigan State University.

References

1932 births
2015 deaths
American football quarterbacks
Canadian football running backs
Oklahoma State Cowboys football players
Michigan State Spartans football players
Edmonton Elks players